Johann Jakob Frey (27 January 1813 - 30 September 1865), a Swiss landscape painter, a native of Basle, studied principally in Italy, and his views of that country are much valued. From Egypt, whither he accompanied Professor Lepsius, he brought many excellent sketches of the pyramids, labyrinths etc. It is to be regretted that he was obliged to make but a short stay on account of his health. His painting of 'Chamsyn in the Desert,' in the possession of the Emperor of Germany, was produced in 1845, and is greatly admired. He died at Frascati, near Rome, in 1865. The Modern Gallery at Munich has his Two Memnons near Thebes.

Notes

 

1813 births
1865 deaths
19th-century Swiss painters
Swiss male painters
Swiss landscape painters
Artists from Basel-Stadt
19th-century Swiss male artists